Margaret Bunting Wyman Tent (born Margaret Bunting Wyman; November 2, 1944 – September 20, 2014), also known by her pen name M. B. W. Tent, was an American mathematics educator and writer. She was the author of several bestselling books.

Life 
Tent was born in Westfield, Massachusetts and grew up in Amherst, Massachusetts.  She worked as a teacher at Altamont high school in Birmingham, Alabama beginning in 1985. In 2010, she and her husband moved to Frederick, Maryland to retire from teaching and continue writing.

On September 20, 2014 she died of breast cancer at a hospice in Mount Airy, Maryland at age 69.

Career 
Tent attended Amherst Regional High School and is a graduate of Mount Holyoke College.  She received her bachelor's and master's degree from the University of Alabama, Birmingham.

Before teaching post-secondary education, she taught adult education at business colleges and for two years for the American Military in Berlin, Germany.

She has been teaching and writing about mathematics for many years.

Critical reception 
Most of her books have received good reviews from organizations such as the Mathematical Association of America, Association for Computing Machinery and Goodreads.

Her books have received hundreds of citations in the academic press.

Her books have also received praise from other authors and mathematicians like William Dunham, Peter Lax, Cathleen Synge Morawetz, Charles Ashbacher and Peter M. Neumann.

Bibliography 
Some of her best known works are:
 The Prince of Mathematics: Carl Friedrich Gauss 
 Emmy Noether: The Mother of Modern Algebra 
 Gottfried Wilhelm Leibniz: The Polymath Who Brought Us Calculus 
 Leonhard Euler and the Bernoullis: Mathematicians from Basel

References

External links 
 Goodreads author page

1944 births
2014 deaths
Schoolteachers from Alabama
American women educators
Mount Holyoke College alumni
University of Alabama at Birmingham alumni
20th-century American women
21st-century American women